Intelig Telecom started operations on 23 January 2000, bringing for the first time concurrence on the long distance and international phone service. Local operations started in September 2003 and 2 years later, they launched a free dial-up internet service, the InteligWeb. With an investment of R$2,8 billions, it started to build its infrastructure in 1999, even before entering operations. They have more than 16 thousand kilometers of fiber optics in their network. Their headquarters are in Rio de Janeiro.

In 2010, it was bought by Italian-Brazilian operator TIM Brazil, joining the two codes: 23:41, with the impetus to compete primarily with national Oi, using the codes 31 and 14 (former Brasil Telecom), beyond Embratel/Claro, Vivo/Telefónica, GVT and Nextel, both also multinationals.

Operation

Intelig started as a mirror of Embratel on long distance and international phone service after the privatization of the Telebrás system. With the opening of long distance market in 2002, they implemented their product list with data service (VPN, DIP, ATM, etc.), local services, and hubbing for other telecommunication companies. Their current focus is the comparative market.

Acquisition by Telecom Italia/TIM Brazil 

On 16 April 2009 Telecom Italia, through TIM, announced the negotiation to buy Intelig. The negotiation have the objective to boost the TIM data infrastructure, that was suffering from the growth in users of its 3G services, On 6 August 2009 ANATEL granted authorization for the merge.

See also

 List of internet service providers in Brazil
 Sanduíche-iche – meme used in a television advertisement for the company

References

External links
Official Page 
Provedor Intelig Web 

Telecommunications companies of Brazil
Defunct telecommunications companies
Internet service providers of Brazil
Companies based in Rio de Janeiro (city)
Telecommunications companies established in 2000
Technology companies disestablished in 2010
2000 establishments in Brazil
2010 disestablishments in Brazil
Defunct companies of Brazil